Greece participated in the Eurovision Song Contest 2022 in Turin, Italy. The Hellenic Broadcasting Corporation (ERT) internally selected Amanda Tenfjord to represent the nation with the song "Die Together", written by Tenfjord and Bjørn Helge Gammelsæter. Tenfjord was announced as the Greek representative on 15 December 2021, with her song later presented to the public on 10 March 2022. 

To promote the entry, a music video for the song was created as well as an acoustic version. Greece was drawn to compete in the first semi-final of the Eurovision Song Contest which took place on 10 May 2022. Performing during the show in position 15, "Die Together" placed third in the semi-final with 211 points and qualified to compete in the final. In the final, held four days later, Greece placed eighth with 215 points.

Background 

Between 2004 and 2013, the nation achieved nine top ten placements in the final. -entrant Argo with their song "Utopian Land" failed to qualify the nation to the final for the first time ever, marking Greece's worst result at the contest and leading to their absence from the final for the first time since 2000, a contest they did not take part in. For the two contests prior to 2022, the nation once again returned to qualifying for the final, including  Stefania and her song "Last Dance", which placed 10th with 170 points.

The Greek national broadcaster, Hellenic Broadcasting Corporation (ERT), broadcasts the event within Greece and organises the selection process for the nation's entry. ERT had been in charge of Greece's participation in the contest since their debut in 1974 until 2013 when the broadcaster was shutdown by a government directive and replaced firstly with the interim  (DT) and then later by the New Hellenic Radio, Internet and Television (NERIT) broadcaster. Following the victory of the  party at the January 2015 Greek legislative election, the Hellenic Parliament re-instated ERT as the public Greek broadcaster by the renaming of NERIT as ERT, which began broadcasting in June 2015. ERT confirmed their intentions to participate at the 2022 Eurovision Song Contest on 6 September 2021.

Before Eurovision

Internal selection 
On 7 September 2021, ERT opened a submission period where artists and composers were able to submit up to three songs each for consideration by the broadcaster with a 10 October 2021 deadline. Artists were required to be signed to record labels and their proposal had to indicate the accompanying artistic group as well as ideas or concepts for the song's promotion and presentation. Following the deadline, 25 artists were reported to have submitted applications from a total of more than 40 entries, including Constantinos Christophorou (and ), Ilias Kozas, Joanne (Ioanna Georgakopoulou, winner of The Voice of Greece 7), Jimmy Sion (runner-up of House of Fame), as well as singers Amanda Tenfjord, Artemis Matafia, Evangelia, Good Job Nicky, Kianna, Marseaux, Nikos Ganos, and band Mobvibe.

A seven-member jury panel—chaired by music composer and ERT board member Dimitris Papadimitriou and including ERT figures Maria Kozakou, Fotis Apergis and Konstantinos Bourounis, alongside music producers Petros Adam
and Giannis Petridis—shortlisted five entrants in late October 2021. Following this procedure, each member could pick between 5 and 10 entries, and the ones among these that obtained the majority of the preferences were selected to the following phase. The committee then proceeded to discuss with the acts the details of their potential participation at ERT's headquarters, planning to make their final decision by the end of December 2021. On 17 November 2021, Nancy Zampetoglou and Thanasis Anagnostopoulos announced the shortlisted acts on their ERT program Studio 4. These were: Good Job Nicky, Joanna Drigo, Ilias Kozas, Lou Is (stage name of Louiza Sofianopoulou) and Amanda Tenfjord.

Tenfjord was ultimately announced as the selected entrant on 15 December 2021, with her song to be revealed the first week of March 2022.  In late February 2022, a demo was leaked of the entry, which is reported to be titled "Die Together". The official reveal of the song took place on 10 March. "Die Together" was written by Tenfjord and Bjørn Helge Gammelsæter and produced by Gammelsæter.

Promotion
To promote the entry, the music video was released on 10 March during the song's presentation on Studio 4. It had been filmed in early February on the Greek island of Symi. An acoustic version of the song was released on 8 April and was created with the Norwegian University of Science and Technology Medical Students Choir; it was arranged by Edvard Synnes and filmed by Kristoffer Skogheim. Tenfjord performed the song live for the first time on 14 April during ERT's chat show Dynata where she also spoke about the her upcoming participation in the contest. The appearance also included previous Greek Eurovision contestant's Bessy Argyraki (Greece 1977), Nikos Raptakis (Greece 2014) and Konstantinos Christoforou (Cyprus 1996, 2002, 2005).

At Eurovision 
Prior to the semi-final allocation draw, the European Broadcasting Union (EBU) split the competing countries into six different pots based on voting patterns from previous contests as determined by the contest's televoting partner Digame, with the aim of reducing the chance of neighbourly voting between countries while also increasing suspense during the voting process. Therein, it was announced that Greece was scheduled to perform in the second half of the first semi-final of the contest, to be held on 10 May 2022. Once all the competing entries for the 2022 contest had been released, the running order for the semi-finals was decided by the producers of the contest to prevent similar songs from being placed next to each other. In Greece, all shows were broadcast on ERT1, Deftero Programma and Voice of Greece, with commentary by Maria Kozakou and Giorgos Kapoutzidis.

Performances

Tenfjord took part in technical rehearsals on 1 and 4 May, followed by dress rehearsals on 9 and 10 May 2022. This included the jury show on 9 May where the professional juries of each country watched and voted on the competing entries. Fokas Evangelinos was the stage director for the performance, having served in that role last year for Greece as well. The Greek performance featured Tenfjord wearing a silvery-white sheer high-necked gown designed by Celia Kritharioti; she was surrounded blue LED lighting and scattered broken chairs that melted into the stage, representing loss and absence. Speaking about his staging strategy, Evangelinos told ERT that Tenfjord's solo appearance and simple presentation emphasises "three elements: the absence, the toll and the grief of a separation". At the end of the semi-final, Greece was announced as having finished in the top 10 and subsequently qualifying for the final. This marked the third consecutive qualification to the final for Greece. It was later revealed that "Die Together" placed third in the semi-final, receiving a total of 211 points: 60 points from the televoting and 151 points from the juries.

Shortly after the first semi-final, a winners' press conference was held for the ten qualifying countries. As part of this press conference, the qualifying artists took part in a draw to determine which half of the final they would subsequently participate in. This draw was done in the order the countries appeared in the semi-final running order. Greece was drawn to compete in the second half. Following this draw, the shows' producers decided upon the running order of the final, as they had done for the semi-finals. Tenfjord once again took part in dress rehearsals on 13 and 14 May before the final, including the jury final where the professional juries cast their final votes before the live show. At the 14 May final, Greece placed eighth, scoring 215 points: 57 points from the televoting and 158 points from the juries.

Voting 

Below is a breakdown of points awarded to Greece during the first semi-final and final. Voting during the three shows involved each country awarding two sets of points from 1-8, 10 and 12: one from their professional jury and the other from televoting. The exact composition of the professional jury, and the results of each country's jury and televoting were released after the final; the individual results from each jury member were released in an anonymised form. The Greek jury consisted of Christianna Danezi, Dimitrios Masouras, Elli Karvoni, Nikos Antoniou, and Victoria Chalkitis. In the first semi-final, Greece finished in third place out of seventeen entries, marking Greece's third consecutive qualification to the final. The Greek spokesperson, who announced the top 12-point score awarded by the Greek jury during the final, was last year's representative Stefania.

Points awarded to Greece

Points awarded by Greece

Detailed voting results
The following members comprised the Greek jury:
 Christianna Danezi – Musician, singer-songwriter
 Dimitrios Masouras – Production manager, creative director
 Elli Karvoni – Singer-songwriter
 Nikos Antoniou – Musician, producer
 Victoria Chalkitis – Singer, songwriter

References

2022
Countries in the Eurovision Song Contest 2022
Eurovision